The Life Burns Tour DVD is a DVD of a Concert by Classical Finnish Band, Apocalyptica. The tour was in promotion of the Untitled Apocalyptica album, named after one of their singles from that album titled Life Burns!

Track listing

Extras
"US Tour Film" (Bonus Material)
"EPK - Repressed" (Bonus Material)
"Bittersweet" (Video)
"Life Burns!" (Video)
"En Vie" (Video)
"Faraway Vol. 2" (Video)
"Somewhere Around Nothing" (Video)
"Seemann" (Video) (Rammstein cover)
"Repressed" (Video)

Credits

Apocalyptica
Eicca Toppinen - cello
Paavo Lötjönen - cello
Perttu Kivilaakso - cello
Mikko Siren - drums

Others
Antero Manninen - cello
Svante Forsbäck - mastering
TT Oksala - mixing
Dirk Doering - DVD menu design
Paul Hauptmann - Director

Editors
Oliver Fugo
Ilona Kalisch

References

Apocalyptica video albums
2006 video albums
Live video albums
2006 live albums